The Hayek Lecture is hosted annually by the Institute of Economic Affairs in memory of Nobel Prize-winning economist Friedrich Hayek.

The first Annual Hayek Memorial Lecture was delivered by Jeffrey Sachs of Harvard University in June 1992. The lecture has been delivered by speakers ranging from academics to religious leaders, from politicians to historians. Subjects have included immigration, private education in the developing world, the economic relationship between China and Europe, and the future of capitalism.

Speakers

 1992 – Jeffrey Sachs, director, Earth Institute, Columbia University
 1993 – Michael Novak, director of social and political studies, American Enterprise Institute
 1994 – Peter Sutherland, businessman and former attorney general of Ireland
 1995 – The Rt Hon Francis Maude MP, minister for the Cabinet Office and Paymaster General
 1996 – Dr Donald Brash, former governor, Reserve Bank of New Zealand
 1997 – Dr Vaclav Klaus, president, Czech Republic
 1998 – Baron Jonathan Sacks, chief rabbi of the United Hebrew Congregations of the Commonwealth
 1999 – Professor Otmar Issing, former member of the executive board of the European Central Bank
 2000 – Dr Benno Schmidt, Edison Schools
 2001 – Charles Calomiris, Henry Kaufman Professor of Financial Institutions, Columbia Business School
 2002 – Hernando de Soto, president, of the Institute for Liberty and Democracy
 2003 – Bill Emmott, former editor-in-chief, The Economist
 2004 – Martin Wolf, associate editor and chief economics commentator at the Financial Times
 2005 – Andrew Neil, journalist and broadcaster
 2006 – The Hon Gale Norton, US Interior Secretary 2001-2006
 2007 – Terence Kealey, professor of clinical biochemistry, University of Buckingham
 2008 – Paul Johnson, writer and historian
 2009 – James Tooley, professor of education policy at Newcastle University
 2010 – Professor Gary Becker, economist and Nobel laureate
 2011 – Robert Barro of Harvard University. Considered one of the founders of new classical macroeconomic, Barro is the current Paul M. Warburg Professor of Economics at Harvard.
 2012 – Elinor Ostrom, professor of political science, Indiana University, 2009 Nobel Memorial Prize in Economics laureate
 2013 – Grover Norquist, president of Americans for Tax Reform (ATR), co-founder of the Islamic Free Market Institute
 2014 – John B. Taylor, Mary and Robert Raymond Professor of Economics at Stanford University and the George P. Shultz Senior Fellow in Economics at the Hoover Institution.
 2015 – William Easterly, professor of economics, New York University.
 2016 – George Selgin, professor emeritus of economics, University of Georgia
 2017 – Steven Landsburg, professor of economics, University of Rochester
 2018 – Matt Ridley, author, journalist and businessman
 2019 – Bryan Caplan, professor of economics, George Mason University
 2020 – Stephen Davies, economic historian, author

References

Lecture series